Libert is a surname. Notable people with the surname include:

 Clement Liebert (15th century), Franco-Flemish singer and composer
 Eduard von Liebert (1850-1934), Imperial German Army general 
 Heinz Liebert (born 1936), German chess player
 Joy Liebert (1914–1999), English cricketer
 Kathy Liebert (born 1967), American professional poker player
 Mary Ann Liebert, founder of Mary Ann Liebert, Inc., a publishing company
 Ottmar Liebert, German-born composer and guitarist
 Ralph Liebert, founder of Liebert (company)
 Reginaldus Liebert (15th century), French composer
 Ursula Liebert (1933–1998), German chess player
 Johan Liebert, Monster Series. 

Surnames from given names
Surnames of German origin